Ivory Coast first competed at the Paralympic Games in 1996. It has participated in every Summer Paralympics since then, but has never taken part in the Winter Paralympics. Côte d'Ivoire has won four Paralympic medals, three gold and one bronze, all in the sport of track and field athletics. All three of the gold medals were won by Oumar Basakoulba Kone.

Ivory Coast will be taking part in the 2012 Summer Paralympics, and the Fédération Ivoirienne des Sports Paralympiques have chosen Bedford as the UK training base for its Paralympians.

Medalists

References